Hungary women's national goalball team is the women's national team of Hungary.  Goalball is a team sport designed specifically for athletes with a vision impairment.  The team has taken part in international competitions.

IBSA World Games

2011 Antalya  

The team competed in the 2011 IBSA World Games from 1 to 10 April 2011, in Antalya, Turkey, organised by the Turkish Blind Sports Federation.  There were fifteen men's and fourteen women's teams.  They placed sixth of seven teams in Group X, and were twelfth in the final standings.

Regional championships 

The team has competed in the IBSA Europe goalball region.  

Six teams took part in the 2010 IBSA European Championships Goalball Women B tournament held in Eskişehir, Turkey in July. The team finished fourth.

Competitive history 

The table below contains individual game results for the team in international matches and competitions.

References

Goalball women's
National women's goalball teams
Hungary at the Paralympics
European national goalball teams